The  2018 Rising Phoenix World Championships was an IFBB Wings of Strength female professional bodybuilding competition and held in conjunction with the IFBB Arizona Pro. It was held on September 8, 2018 at the Wild Horse Pass Hotel & Casino in Chandler, Arizona.

Prize money

Overall award prize money
1st - $50,000 + $100,000 Corvette
2nd - $25,000
3rd - $12,500
4th - $7,500
5th - $5,000
Total: $100,000 + $100,000 Corvette

Best poser award prize money
This award was sponsored by Elevation Solar, MuscleGirlzLive, and Wings of Strength.

1st - $5,000
2nd - $2,000
3rd - $1,000
Total: $8,000

Best intro video award prize money
This award was sponsored by Offerpad, MAS Body Construction, and MELODY and KARLETTA SPETKO .

1st - $5,000
2nd - $2,000
3rd - $1,000
Total: $8,000

Most muscular award prize money
This award was sponsored by Muscle Angels, HerBiceps.com, and Wings of Strength.

Total: $7,000

Results

Overall results
1st - Alina Popa
2nd - Margaret Martin
3rd - Sheila Bleck
4th - Nicole Chartrand
5th - Helle Trevino
6th - Jill Blondin
7th - Virginia Sanchez
8th - Tananarive Huie
9th - LaDawn McDay
10th - Maria Mikola
11th - Jacqueline Fuchs
12th - Maryse Manios
13th - Susanna Jacobs
14th - Wendy McCready
15th - Barbara Carità
16th - Patty Corbett
16th - Cristina Franzoso
16th - Pauline Nelson
16th - Angela Rayburn
16th - Isabelle Turell

Comparison to previous Rising Phoenix World Championships results:

+2 - Alina Popa
-1 - Margaret Martin
-1 - Sheila Bleck
+8 - Nicole Chartrand
-4 - Helle Trevino
-2 - Virginia Sanchez
+4 - Maria Mikola
+1 - Jacqueline Fuchs
-10 - Wendy McCready
Same - Cristina Franzoso
Same - Pauline Nelson
Same - Angela Rayburn
-3 - Isabelle Turell

Scorecard

Best poser results
1st - Nicole Chartrand
2nd - Sheila Bleck
3rd - Pauline Nelson

Comparison to previous Rising Phoenix World Championships results: 

-1 - Sheila Bleck
Same - Pauline Nelson

Best intro results
1st - LaDawn McDay
2nd - Virginia Sanchez
3rd - Alina Popa

Most muscular winner
Winner - Helle Trevino

Comparison to previous Rising Phoenix World Championships results: 

+1 - Helle Trevino
-1 - Aleesha Young

2018 Rising Phoenix World Championships Qualified

Points standings

 In the event of a tie, the competitor with the best top five contest placings will be awarded the qualification. If both competitors have the same contest placings, than both will qualify for the Rising Phoenix World Championships.

Notable events
This was Alina Popa's 1st Ms Rising Phoenix overall award win.
This was Nicole Chartrand's 1st Ms Rising Phoenix best poser award win.
This was LaDawn McDay's 1st Ms Rising Phoenix best intro award win.
This was Helle Trevino's 1st Ms Rising Phoenix most muscular award win.
 This will be the first Rising Phoenix World Championships that will have two Ms Rising Phoenix champions competing against each other.
 Yaxeni Oriquen-Garcia qualified, but will not attend.

See also
2018 Mr. Olympia

References

External links

Rising Phoenix
Rising Phoenix
History of female bodybuilding
Female professional bodybuilding competitions